Blaouza (also spelt Blawza and Blouza), is a Maronite Christian village in the Bsharri District of the North Governorate of Lebanon. The population is approximately 457 (2021), and the village lies at an altitude of 1,320 metres above sea level.

The Village and its History

Blaouza lies in the Qannoubine Valley region of the Qadisha Valley, an area settled 1,000-1,300 years ago by Maronite refugees fleeing persecution in the remote mountains of Lebanon and Syria. In their isolation, the communities of the Qadisha Valley preserved their religion, customs and language until the modern era. Unlike most Maronites in Lebanon, residents of Blaouza (and the Qadisha Valley in general) claim to be of Aramean, rather than Phoenician descent.

Most villages in the region have Aramaic names, and the name Blaouza comes from the Aramaic for "almond plains". Until the early 20th century, most villagers were Aramaic-speakers, and as a result, Blaouza natives speak Arabic with a distinct accent. This is also true of many of the Maronite villages of the region.

In 1998 it was reported that Blaouza had a population of around 200, whilst there were an estimated 10,000 people in Sydney who identified their families as coming from the village.

Famous residents

 Gabriel of Blaouza (born circa 1625), Maronite Patriarch 1704-1705

See also
 Bsharri District
 Kadisha Valley
 Maronites
 Lebanon

References

External links
 Australian Blouza Association

Populated places in the North Governorate
Bsharri District
Maronite Christian communities in Lebanon